The Gypsy and the King (Spanish:La gitana y el rey) is a 1946 Spanish film directed by Manuel Bengoa.

Cast
   Antoñita Colomé 
 Alfonso de Horna 
 Jorge Mistral 
 Julia Pachelo 
 Manuel Requena 
 Santiago Rivero 
 Joaquín Roa

References

Bibliography 
  Eva Woods Peiró. White Gypsies: Race and Stardom in Spanish Musical Films. U of Minnesota Press, 2012.

External links 
 

1946 films
1940s Spanish-language films
Spanish black-and-white films
1940s Spanish films